Osman Soykut (born January 1, 1957), better known by his stage name Ozman Sirgood, is an American actor of Turkish and Dagestani heritage.

Biography 

Ozman Sirgood is an established actor who works in film and television projects on both sides of the Atlantic. A celebrity in his native Turkey, Ozman makes his home in Los Angeles, California. Ozman's career spans 17 years and three continents.

Ozman was born as Osman Soykut in Ankara, Turkey. His heritage includes Dagestani Avar roots on his mother's side and Crimean Tatar from his father. He attended Frankfurt International School, TED Ankara College Foundation Schools and holds a Bachelor of Architecture degree from the Middle East Technical University.

He moved to California in 1984 and began his acting career in 1989. In 2001, he began receiving training from Milton Katselas at the Beverly Hills Playhouse, continuing until Milton's death in 2008.

Ozman found quick success as an actor in Los Angeles and played in a number of productions including Charmed, Alias, The Bold And The Beautiful, The Hot Chick, Art School Confidential and others.

Discovered for the Turkish market in 2007, Ozman went to Istanbul with a lead role in the TV drama Iki Yabanci. Quickly gaining a reputation as a skilled actor, he continued with bigger roles in Pars Narkoteror and Adanalı.

In 2009, he was cast as the suave and deadly Aron Feller in the long-running TV action drama Kurtlar Vadisi Pusu which he played for three seasons. In 2014, he was selected to play İbn-i Arabi in the historical TV drama Diriliş: Ertuğrul, another very successful role.  In 2016, he played opposite Christian Bale as Dep. Gov. Mazhar in the epic drama The Promise directed by Terry George.

Filmography

References

External links
 
 Official website

1957 births
Living people
American male actors
Turkish American
American people of Turkish descent
People from Ankara
Turkish male film actors
Turkish male television actors
21st-century Turkish male actors
Middle East Technical University alumni